In optics, various autocorrelation functions can be experimentally realized. The field autocorrelation may be used to calculate the spectrum of a source of light, while the intensity autocorrelation and the interferometric autocorrelation are commonly used to estimate the duration of ultrashort pulses produced by modelocked lasers.   The laser pulse duration cannot be easily measured by optoelectronic methods, since the response time of photodiodes and oscilloscopes are at best of the order of 200 femtoseconds, yet laser pulses can be made as short as a few femtoseconds.

In the following examples, the autocorrelation signal is generated by the nonlinear process of second-harmonic generation (SHG). Other techniques based on two-photon absorption may also be used in autocorrelation measurements, as well as higher-order nonlinear optical processes such as third-harmonic generation, in which case the mathematical expressions of the signal will be slightly modified, but the basic interpretation of an autocorrelation trace remains the same.  A detailed discussion on interferometric autocorrelation is given in several well-known textbooks.

Field autocorrelation

For a complex electric field , the field autocorrelation function is defined by

 
As a result, the field autocorrelation is not sensitive to the spectral phase.

The field autocorrelation is readily measured experimentally by placing a slow detector at the output of a Michelson interferometer.  The detector is illuminated by the input electric field  coming from one arm, and by the delayed replica  from the other arm.  If the time response of the detector is much larger than the time duration of the signal , or if the recorded signal is integrated, the detector measures the intensity  as the delay  is scanned:

 

This principle is the basis for Fourier transform spectroscopy.

Intensity autocorrelation
To a complex electric field  corresponds an intensity  and an intensity autocorrelation function defined by

 

The optical implementation of the intensity autocorrelation is not as straightforward as for the field autocorrelation. Only the beam propagating on the optical axis, proportional to the cross-product , is retained. This signal is then recorded by a slow detector, which measures

 

 is exactly the intensity autocorrelation .

The generation of the second harmonic in crystals is a nonlinear process that requires high peak power, unlike the previous setup. However, such high peak power can be obtained from a limited amount of energy by ultrashort pulses, and as a result their intensity autocorrelation is often measured experimentally. Another difficulty with this setup is that both beams must be focused at the same point inside the crystal as the delay is scanned in order for the second harmonic to be generated.

It can be shown that the intensity autocorrelation width of a pulse is related to the intensity width.  For a Gaussian time profile, the autocorrelation width is  longer than the width of the intensity, and it is 1.54 longer in the case of a hyperbolic secant squared (sech2) pulse.  This numerical factor, which depends on the shape of the pulse, is sometimes called the deconvolution factor.  If this factor is known, or assumed, the time duration (intensity width) of a pulse can be measured using an intensity autocorrelation. However, the phase cannot be measured.

Interferometric autocorrelation

As a combination of both previous cases, a nonlinear crystal can be used to generate the second harmonic at the output of a Michelson interferometer, in a collinear geometry. In this case, the signal recorded by a slow detector is

 

 is called the interferometric autocorrelation. It contains some information about the phase of the pulse: the fringes in the autocorrelation trace wash out as the spectral phase becomes more complex.

Pupil function autocorrelation
The optical transfer function T(w) of an optical system is given by the autocorrelation of its pupil function f(x,y):

See also
Autocorrelator
Convolution
Degree of coherence
Frequency-resolved optical gating
Multiphoton intrapulse interference phase scan
Spectral phase interferometry for direct electric-field reconstruction

References

Optical metrology
Nonlinear optics
Laser science